Gaj Singh Rathore (Marwari: गज सिंह राठौड़; 30 October 1595 – 6 May 1638) was the Raja of Marwar kingdom ( 7 September 1619 – 6 May 1638).

Early Years 
Born 30 October 1595, he was the eldest surviving son of Sur Singh, Raja of Marwar. His mother, Rani Sobhag deviji née Krishnavati Bai, was the daughter of Sekhavat Kachvahi Durjan Sal.

On 1608, he visited the court of Jahangir with his father. In 1609, Mahabat Khan, who was on an expedition against Rana of Mewar, was misinformed that the family of Rana was under the protection of Sur Singh in the Fort of Sojat. Mahabat Khan, thus granted Sojat to Karam Singh, a grandson of Chandrasen. This misinformation was only cleared on the intervention of Bhatai Govinddas and Sojat and Nagore was restored to Gaj Singh by Abdullah Khan.

Jalor, which was in control of Bihari Pathans, was given as jagir to Gaj Singh by Jahangir. Gaj Singh then had bought Jalor successfully under his control.

Reign 

Gaj Singh was at Jodhpur when Sur Singh breathed his last in Mahikar, Deccan. Hearing the news, he immediately proceeded to Deccan leaving a noble named Rajsingh Kumpawat in-charge of Jodhpur.

Jahangir sent a tika to Gaj Singh and had granted him the pargana of Jaitaran, Sojat, Siwana,  Satalmar, Jodhpur, Terwada and Gondwada and also bestowed upon him a mansab of 3000 Zat and 2000 Sawar along with the title of Raja.

He soon after proceeded toto Mughal outpost at Mahikar.  Forces of Ahmadnager led by Amber Jeo which the Raja repelled successfully. For his services, he was granted the title 'Dalthaman'. When Prince Khurram was given in-charge of Deccan, Gaj Singh took a leave and proceeded to Jodhpur viz. Agra. Jahangir raised his mansab to 4000 Zat and 3000 Sawar and granted him the parganas of Jalor and Sanchor.

On 5 May 1623, Gaj Singh was deputized along with Mahabat Khan and Parviz Mirza to hunt down the rebel Prince Khurram. On the eve of his departure, he was given Phalodi in jagir and his mansab was raised to 5000 Zat and 4000 Sawar.

On 16 October 1624, a battle was fought between the imperial army and Khurram's army. Gaj Singh was initially not willing to take active part in this battle and encamped himself on the left side if the river. The rebel army almost won when Bhim Sisodia, ally of Khurram, challenged him to take part in the battle. The coarse language caused Gaj Singh to take active part in the battle and soon the rebel army was enrouted. The reason of Gaj Singh's unwillingness might have been due to the close relation he shared with Khurram, who was born of the Jodhpur Princess, Jodh bai, who was the uterine sister of his father Sur Singh. Another reason might have been that, he had judged the days of the Emperor was numbered and wanted to be on good side of Khurram. However, his wish could not be fulfilled. Still, due to this victory, he received the rank of 5000 Zat and 5000 Sawar by Jahangir.

Raja Gaj Singh with  Khan Jahan Lodi was in Deccan when Jahangir breathed his last. Gaj Singh then deserted Khan Jahan.

Gaj Singh visited the court of Shah Jahan soon after his accession. The Emperor renewed Gaj Singh's mansab and awarded him Khasa Khilat (a special robe of honour), a sword, a horse, an elephant and a kettledrum. He was deputed against Khan Jahan Lodi, the rebel governor of Deccan on 22 February 1630. He was made the commander of one of the three armies against Khan Jahan and faced the guerrilla tactics of the rebels valiantly. For his services he was awarded pargana of Mahrot in jagir and the title of 'Maharaja' was conferred upon him.

He was deputed with Asaf Khan against the sultan of Bijapur in December 1631. In March 1636, he was awarded a horse with its special golden equipment and returned from Deccan along with the Emperor Shah Jahan. He was then deputed in the army under Prince Shuja.

Gajsinh ri Khyat 
This khyat chronicles the events in the rulers life from his coronation in V.S. 1676 (1619 AD) to his death in 1638 AD. It also records Gaj Singh conferring various charitable grants including lakh pasav and Sasan lands to the Charans.

Death 
Gaj Singh died soon after his return to Agra on 6 May 1638 and was cremated on the bank of river Yamuna.

Ancestry

See also
Rulers of Marwar

References

Monarchs of Marwar
People from Lahore
1595 births
1638 deaths